This is a list of events taking place in 2023 relating to radio in the United Kingdom.

Events

January
 1 January – 
BBC Radio 2 dedicates five hours of New Year's Day programming to Take That, including a two-hour countdown of their top hits.
Damian Lewis presents a two hour programme, A Blues and Swing Special, on Jazz FM. 
Charlie Higson returns to Scala Radio for a second series of Charlie Higson and Friends.  
 2 January – 
Former Blue Peter presenter Lindsey Russell takes over as presenter of the weekday Early Breakfast show at Heart.   
Adil Ray presents a one-off show for Jazz FM on New Year Bank Holiday Monday. 
The Community Media Association undergoes a rebrand for its 40th anniversary. 
 3 January –
 CassKidd joins BBC Radio 1Xtra to present a Tuesday evening show previously hosted by Jamz Supernova.
 Sonny Jay begins presenting the weekday late night show on Capital.
 Former Jack FM presenter Trevor Marshall joins Get Radio Oxfordshire to present weekday drivetime.
The Radio Today website reports that during V2 Radio's six-week toy appeal leading up to Christmas 2022, listeners donated more than 2,400 toys for local charities and organisations in West Sussex. 
 4 January – 
Bauer Radio confirms all of Absolute Radio's mediumwave transmitters will be switched off by the end of January, making it exclusively a digital station.  The switch-off is expected to take place on 23 January.
The Asian Network Takeover returns for a new series, with a new presenter each month.
 5 January – Figures released by BBC Sounds show there were 57.7 million listens to its content between 20 December and 2 January.   
 6 January – 
Ofcom begins awarding the fourth tranche of its small-scale DAB licences, beginning with those for Glenrothes and Kirkcaldy, Ludlow, and Newport and Chepstow.  
Shaun Keaveny begins a four-week presenting stint on The Radio 2 Rock Show, standing in for regular presenter Johnnie Walker.
Radio News Hub have been acquired by Markettiers4DC, a broadcasting PR agency.
 7 January – 
Former Capital presenter Rob Howard begins presenting weekend Early Breakfast at Heart.
Trevor Marshall and Rich Smith begin presenting weekend breakfast for Get Radio Oxfordshire.
 8 January – Andrew Marr joins Classic FM to present a Sunday morning programme in which he selects some of his favourite pieces of classical music alongside newer releases. 
 9 January –
 Phil Williams and OJ Borg confirm Williams is taking over Borg's Sunday night into Monday morning show on Radio 2, with Borg continuing to present four nights a week.  
 Five folk songs about modern folk heroes by artists such as Chris Difford and Thea Gilmore have been created as part of Radio 2's 21st Century Folk project. 
 BBC Asian Network confirms that Nikita Kanda will be its new regular breakfast show presenter, Kanda having presented the programme for the past six months.  
 Ricky Wilson of Kaiser Chiefs joins Virgin Radio to present the weekday drivetime show.
 Sam Thompson begins presenting Hits Radio's weekday evening show, Hits UK.
 Hits Radio presenter Jordon Lee takes over weekday early breakfast on Kiss, but continues with his breakfast show on Hits Radio Pride and afternoons on heat radio.  
 Gaydio becomes available on DAB in a further seven UK cities – Glasgow, Edinburgh, Cardiff, Birmingham, Bristol, Leeds and Sheffield.  
 Rock FM is found to be in breach of Ofcom regulations following the broadcast of a pre-recorded voice note from a listener on the 19 October 2022 edition of its breakfast show in which the word "cunt" was heard at the end of the recording. The piece had not been vetted before broadcast.  
 10 January – 
It is confirmed that Bob Shennan, the former Controller of BBC Radio 2, BBC Radio 5 Live, BBC 6 Music and the BBC Asian Network is to leave the broadcaster after 36 years.   
Lauren Mahon and Steve Bland, presenters of the podcast You, Me and the Big C, have said they are ready to step down from their roles, but hope that the podcast will continue without them. 
Victoria Quinn leaves Q Radio to become breakfast show presenter at Downtown Country. 
 11 January – 
Bauer Media Audio UK have appointed Lucie Cave to the newly created role of Chief Creative Officer for Podcasts and Commercial Content. 
Ofcom is reported to be considering a request by community station Cross Counties Radio for it to be allowed to change the number of hours of original content it must provide from 161 hours per week to 70.  
Sports journalist Martin Samuel joins talkSPORT as a contributor to the breakfast show, and to co-present a weekly programme on Thursday evenings. 
 13 January – 
Sam Jackson is appointed as Controller of BBC Radio 3.
Ofcom revokes the small-scale DAB licence it awarded to Like DAB Limited for the Scilly Isles after the Like DAB said it would not be able to launch the service by the deadline given to it by Ofcom. 
BBC Sports broadcaster Jennie Gow announces she has suffered a stroke, affecting her speech.  
 14 January – Emperor Rosko joins Radio Caroline to present a series of monthly breakfast shows. 
 17 January – Ken Bruce announces on his Radio 2 show that he will be leaving the network at the end of March. Shortly afterwards, Greatest Hits Radio confirms he will join in April, replacing Mark Goodier on their mid-morning show, and taking the PopMaster quiz with him. 
 18 January – 
Following feedback, the BBC have made some changes to their proposals for BBC Local Radio, including those relating to the networking of shows and the pairing of stations. But plans to cut the number of local BBC Introducing programmes from 32 to 11 are met with concern from musicians and those from the music industry who fear it could a negative effect on new acts trying to break through on to the scene.  
Regency Radio have hired Tommy Boyd to present a show on Sunday nights, with a start date to be confirmed.
Fun Kids launches a subscription service titled Fun Kids Podcast+. 
 19 January – Members of the National Union of Journalists are to hold a consultative ballot on whether to strike over the proposed changes announced for BBC Local Radio. 
 20 January – 
At midnight Absolute Radio stops broadcasting on MW. Consequently, Absolute Radio is now a digital-only station.
Jack FM teams up with comedian Dom Joly for the last gig of his nationwide tour by sponsoring a show at Oxford’s New Theatre.
Dance station Juice FM, launched in December 2022, announces plans to join DAB in North Wales and West Cheshire. 
 23 January – 
Used car marketplace company cinch takes over as sponsor of The Chris Evans Breakfast Show on Virgin Radio, succeeding Sky as the programme's sponsors with a three year sponsorship deal. 
Former GB News reporter and presenter Rosie Wright joins Times Radio to present Weekday Early Breakfast.  
Shaun Tilley joins Liverpool Live to present the drivetime show from 4.00pm. 
The Radio Today website reports that Josh Tate may have become the UK's youngest newsreader after joining Radio Exe at the age of 16. 
Steve McGoldrick has been appointed as the new Head of Marketing at Radiocentre.
 24 January – 
Bristol's Ujima Radio submits a request to Ofcom to change its Key Commitments by broadcasting less non-English output. 
Ofcom have found Leicester-based Radio2Funky and Takeover Radio, as well as Cumbernauld FM, in breach of their commitments after receiving complaints they were not producing enough original output.
BFBS launches its second series of BFBS Esports Live, presented by OJ Borg.  
 25 January – 
City University of London announces the launch of the UK's first MA degree in podcasting, along with a Centre of Podcasting Excellence, with the first students scheduled to begin their studies in September 2023. 
Smooth Radio undergoes a "brand refresh", with a new logo and strapline. "Your relaxing music mix" is replaced by "Always the best music". 
Made in Manchester announces a partnership with Workerbee to generate new content ideas for radio and television.  
45 Radio announces that it has hired former Radio 1 presenter Bruno Brookes to present Bruno's Mega Hits on Saturdays and Sundays from midday. 
Josh Tate, believed to be the UK's youngest newsreader, appears on Matt Chorley's show on Times Radio, where he is invited to read the midday headlines.
 27 January – 
BBC Arabic radio service closes down.
Ofcom initiates proceedings to revoke Bauer Radio's mediumwave licence following its decision to close the national AM feed of Absolute Radio, and consequently ending its licence eight years ahead of schedule. Ofcom also considers financial penalties against Bauer after it confirmed the decision the previous day. 
Frisk Radio have hired David Alley, a former presenter on Heart Bedfordshire and Chiltern FM, to present their weekday drivetime show.  
 30 January – 
BBC Radio 2 begins its 2023 Radio 2 Piano Room feature, which runs until 24 February, and sees different artists performing with the BBC Concert Orchestra at the Maida Vale Studios. The performances are broadcast live on Ken Bruce's mid-morning show.
The Radio Academy holds its inaugural "Last Mondays" event in Central London, a monthly gathering for members of the audio industry featuring guest speakers. 
Listeners to Greatest Hits Radio have voted "Mr. Blue Sky" the top Feel Good Anthem following a poll of songs that make listeners feel good. 
Technology company Aiir announce the launch of Aiir Scheduler, a cloud-based music scheduler for radio stations to create and manage playlists via a web browser.
 31 January – Members of the National Union of Journalists have voted to take industrial action over planned changes to BBC Local Radio.  
 January – Signal 1's Stafford and Congleton transmitters switch to broadcasting Greatest Hits Radio, with Signal 1 continuing to broadcast to Stoke-on-Trent.

February
 1 February – 
BBC Radio Bristol presenter Laura Rawlings is appointed as presenter of The Radio Academy Podcast for the next six months, covering for regular presenter Roisin Hastie while she is on maternity leave. 
Dee Ford, Managing Director of Bauer Media Audio UK, announces plans to leave the role after 35 years with the company.
 2 February – BBC WM announces that its new building in Digbeth, Birmingham, will be known as "The Tea Factory". It will also be home to BBC Radio 1's Newsbeat, Radio 4's The Archers and BBC Asian Network News. 
 3 February – 
The BBC confirms the latest plans to merge its BBC Music Introducing shows, with 20 shows spread across 39 BBC Local Radio stations, airing twice a week, and some shows merging with those of neighbouring stations. 
Former Secretary of State for Culture Nadine Dorries begins presenting a weekly Friday evening show, Friday Night with Nadine, for Talkradio and TalkTV. Her first guest is the former Prime Minister Boris Johnson. 
It is reported that Pierre Petrou has resigns as London Greek Radio's chief programming and content manager. 
The BBC confirms it has hired Erewash Sound Drive presenter Lewis Allsopp as a studio director for Radio 4 and the World Service at Broadcasting House.
 5 February – Radio 2 airs Happy Birthday Tony Blackburn: 80 Poptastic Years to celebrate Tony Blackburn's 80th birthday on 29 January. 
 6 February –  
Bauer Radio launches an ad-free subscription services for Magic Radio and Greatest Hits Radio, enabling listeners to hear additional stations without commercials, and skip live content. 
Iain Lee announces he is leaving Jack FM, and that he is retiring from broadcasting. 
 7 February – 
Lucy Frazer replaces Michelle Donelan as Culture Secretary following a cabinet reshuffle. 
Nielsen has reported a weekly audience of 211,000 tradespeople for Fix Radio.
 8 February – Ofcom awards a further five small-scale DAB licences in Inverclyde, Newry, Northampton, Southampton and Wolverhampton.
 9 February – 
Perminder Khatkar and Victoria Easton-Riley are announced as having been elected to the Radio Academy Board of Trustees.
Bauer announces the launch of its digital audio advertising network, audioXi, in Portugal.
 10 February – Rick Houghton joins Chesterfield F.C.'s online station, 1866 Sport, to present the weekday drivetime show. 
 11 February – 
Emma Scott, formerly of Heart and Kerrang!, joins North Derbyshire Radio to present a weekend lunchtime show. 
Radio Today reports that Radio Essentials has launched on DAB in Sheffield, having been on air online since October 2022. 
 13 February – 
Owain Wyn Evans begins presenting the Radio 2 Early Breakfast Show from Cardiff.  
A report published by Radiocentre indicates that commercial radio in the UK received a collective advertising revenue of £740m during 2022, an increase from £718.7m in 2021. 
Radio News Hub becomes an official partner with the Radio Academy. 
The Disasters Emergency Committee launches a radio appeal following the 2023 Turkey–Syria earthquake voiced by Michael Palin. 
Great British Radio extends its coverage to Edinburgh and Cardiff after launching on DAB+ in those cities.  
 14 February – 
Ofcom revokes the mediumwave licence from Absolute Radio following Bauer's decision to cease broadcasting on its AM frequency.
Capital London presenter Ant Payne apologises for comments he made on his drivetime show the previous day after suggesting it was the appropriate time to book a cheap flight to Turkey. 
 15 February – Magic Breakfast launches an interactive holiday promotion with its sponsor, On the Beach. 
 17 February – 
The LGBTQ-themed radio station, Gaydio, broadcast a minute's silence at 11.00am in collaboration with other UK LGBTQ stations to remember 16-year-old Brianna Ghey, who was stabbed to death on 11 February. The silence is preceded by a feature introduced by transgender presenter Stephanie Hirst in which she reflects on the discrimination and violence often experienced by trans people, as well as paying tribute to Ghey.
Ofcom launches a consultation process after talkSPORT submits a request to turn off four of its 22 AM transmitters, reducing its mediumwave output from 93% to 89.9% of the population. 
Kerrang! Radio fan Hope Lynes has been given her own show on the station, airing every Saturday from 2pm. 
Local Radio Support enters into its first agency partnership, with Manning Gottlieb OMD.
 19 February – She Scores, a series focusing on female composers, returns to Scala Radio for a third series. 
 20 February – 
Ofcom finds Bauer in breach of its regulations over its 2022 Make Me a Winner competition after a promotion on Kiss failed to mention all of the terms and conditions, notably that entrants to the competition on a particular day would still be valid for the rest of the time it was running. The Make Me a Winner competition took place between April and July 2022. 
Creed III actor, producer and director Michael B. Jordan teams up with KISS and the Rio Ferdinand Foundation for their #notboxed campaign, which is designed to help inspire young people.
 21 February – BBC 1Xtra announces that weekday afternoon presenter Reece Parkinson is to leave the network as part of a schedule shake-up. Saturday afternoon presenter Lady Lashurr is also being replaced. 
 24 February – 
Radio 2 confirms Vernon Kay will present the mid-morning show, taking over in May. Gary Davies will present the show on a temporary basis after Ken Bruce leaves in March. 
Steve Allen announces he has left LBC after 44 years in broadcasting. 
Carolyn Quinn, presenter of Radio 4's Westminster Hour and PM programmes, announces she is leaving the BBC after 36 years with the broadcaster. She has also presented her final regular edition of PM.  
Dasha Zakarets, a Ukrainian refugee who came to England at the start of the war, reads the opening minutes of the 8am bulletin on Greatest Hits Radio York and North Yorkshire to mark the first anniversary of the Russian invasion of Ukraine.
 26 February – 
Edward Adoo presents his final Sunday night show on BBC Three Counties Radio after seven and a half years, having decided a few weeks earlier to leave the station ahead of planned schedule changes.
Radio Today reports that Ofcom's Community Radio Fund has made 17 awards to local community stations. 
 27 February – 
Lomond Radio celebrates the 10th birthday of its youngest presenter, Ruairidh Mac, who presents Lomond Radio Kids Edition each Monday evening.
Alton Andrews, a presenter on the original Red Rose Radio, is to join the newly-launched digital Red Rose Radio to present a Saturday morning show.
 28 February – 
Members of the National Union of Journalists working for the BBC regional service in England vote to take strike action over planned cuts to BBC Local Radio. A 24-hour strike is scheduled for 15 March to coincide with Budget Day.
Nation Broadcasting sells its share in Bailiwick Broadcasting, operator of the DAB multiplex covering the Channel Islands, to Tindle CI Broadcasting.

March
 1 March – 
Nation Broadcasting launches Nation New on DAB in Tynemouth and South Shield, a radio station playing nothing but new music by new artists.   
Bauer announces plans to replace Kiss with Greatest Hits Radio on its FM frequencies in Cambridge, Peterborough and Suffolk, subject to Ofcom approval. 
 2 March – 
Kenny Allstar is announced as the new presenter of the Radio 1 Rap Show, replacing Tiffany Calver, who is leaving the programme after four years. 
Small-scale DAB licenses are awarded to Higher Rhythm Limited in Doncaster, PlymDab in Plymouth, and Mid Yorkshire DAB Limited in Wakefield.
Tindle Media Group acquires a 10% stake in Podcast Radio in order to help with its international expansion plans.  
 3 March – Ken Bruce presents his final mid-morning show on Radio 2. 
 4 March – 
Former BBC Radio 5 Live presenter Sam Walker, and Pete Price, previously of Radio City, join Happy Radio to present shows. Walker presents a weekend lunchtime show, while Price presents Guilty Pleasures on Saturday evenings. 
Student radio stations in the south of England get together for a 24-hour broadcast in aid of FareShare, the Journey of a Lifetime Trust, Mind, Stonewall, the Teenage Cancer Trust and UNICEF UK. The broadcast raises £600 for the charities. 
Andrew Collins presents his final edition of Saturday Night at the Movies for Classic FM, having announced the previous day his intention to leave after seven years.  
 5 March – Nominations for BBC Local Radio's Make a Difference Awards close, with over 11,000 nominations later confirmed as having been received.  
 6 March – 
Gary Davies temporarily takes over the BBC Radio 2 mid-morning show. He also launches a replacement for the PopMaster quiz called Ten to the Top.  
RBI Radio is rebranded as Rotherham Radio. 
Ofcom finds 15 community radio stations breached their broadcasting conditions in February 2023, with issues ranging from studio output to not meeting their key commitments. 
 7 March – Radio  News Hub announces it will make a free two-hour live programme available providing budget coverage on Budget Day (15 March). The programme will include coverage of the budget speech, as well as analysis from a panel of experts.  
 8 March – 
Pierre Petrou, the former Head of Programming at London Greek Radio, is appointed as Operations Manager for Radio Maria England. 
Ceri Hurford-Jones, the former Managing Director of Spire FM, joins Salisbury Radio as their Creative Adventures Manager.
 9 March – 
Mae Muller is chosen to represent the UK at the 2023 Eurovision Song Contest with her song "I Wrote a Song". The announcement is made on The Radio 2 Breakfast Show by presenter Zoe Ball. 
Presenter Pat Sharp is reported to have left Greatest Hits Radio "with immediate effect" after making an inappropriate remark about a woman's breasts while comparing an awards event.  
Virgin Radio 80s Plus announces the launch of a Saturday night guest slot presented by a star from the 1980s, beginning with Clare Grogan, who will present the slot for four weeks. She is followed by Matt Goss in April and Carol Decker in May. 
The National Union of Journalists announces plans to hold a strike ballot among staff at BBC Radio Foyle following a management decision to implement schedule changes, which include replacing the two hour morning programme with a 30 minute version. 
 11 March – 
5 Live Sport and Fighting Talk are pulled from the day's schedule on BBC Radio 5 Live after presenters Mark Chapman and Dion Dublin (5 Live Sport) and Colin Murray (Fighting Talk) join other sports BBC sports presenters in refusing to appear on air after the BBC took Gary Lineker off Match of the Day over controversial remarks he made about the UK government's Illegal Migration Bill. 
Emil Franchi begins presenting weekend early breakfast on Absolute Radio. 
Jonathan Ross succeeds Andrew Collins as presenter of Classic FM's Saturday Night at the Movies. 
 12 March – At 8am, Radio Winchcombe becomes available in the Bishops Cleeve area on 106.9FM.  
 13 March – 
Mark Chapman returns to Radio 5 Live for Monday Night Club after the Gary Lineker controversy is resolved. The BBC will initiate an independent review into social media guidance for its presenters. 
Matt Richardson succeeds Iain Lee as presenter of Jack FM breakfast.
Emil Franchi begins presenting weekday afternoons on Absolute Radio 00s. 
 15 March – 
At 11am, members of the National Union of Journalists begin a 24-hour strike on BBC Local Radio, requiring a syndicated programme to air in some areas. 
Tynemouth-based station Frisk Radio announces plans to join DAB in Middlesbrough and Redcar. 
BBC 1Xtra announces schedule changes to come into effect from June, including a show presented by Tiffany Calver on Friday nights. 
 16 March – 
Ofcom gives Bristol-based Ujima Radio permission to change its key commitments to its audience, changing the station to one serving African and Caribbean listeners in the city's St Paul's area. 
Heart 00s announces that Rachel Stevens is joining the station on a temporary basis as a stand-in presenter, covering Ashley Roberts' Saturday afternoon show while Roberts is on holiday. 
Nation Broadcasting have signed Phil Hoyles of Greatest Hits Radio to present Drive on Radio Pembrokeshire, Radio Carmarthenshire and Bridge FM Radio.
 17 March – The nominations for the 12 categories in the 2023 Global Awards are announced. 
 20 March – Bauer launches a regional Greatest Hits Radio service for Cambridge, Peterborough and Suffolk on DAB ahead of proposed changes to its FM frequencies in the area. 
 21 March – At 8pm, Times Radio airs a leadership debate from Edinburgh and featuring the three candidates in the Scottish National Party leadership election. 
 24–25 March – The BBC Radio 6 Music Festival returns to Manchester for 2023, the venue of the very first event in 2014; Manchester will be the festival's permanent home. 
 25 March – 
The 2023 National Hospital Radio Awards are held in Bolton.
The UK Community Radio Network holds a regional networking event at the University of Northampton.
 31 March – The winners of the 2023 Global Awards are announced.

April
 3 April –
Schedule changes at BBC 1Xtra see Keylee Golding take over as presenter of the weekday afternoon show and Remi Bungz presenting weekday drivetime. Golding's afternoon show is the first on the network to move outside London and is presented from Birmingham.   
Ken Bruce joins Greatest Hits Radio to present the mid-morning show from 10.00am to 1.00pm. PopMaster, the UK's most popular radio quiz, also moves to Greatest Hits Radio. To make way for Bruce's show, the morning edition of the Top Ten at 10 is moved to 9am and renamed the Top Ten Till Ken.
Bauer Radio rebrands Clyde 2, Forth 2, MFR 2, Northsound 2, Tay 2, West Sound in Ayrshire, and West Sound in Dumfries & Galloway, and Radio Borders as Greatest Hits Radio, bringing its Scottish stations under the Greatest Hits banner alongside those in England and Wales. 
Bauer replaces Lincs FM with Greatest Hits Radio Lincolnshire on 102.2FM, 96.7FM and 97.6FM, while Lincs FM continues to air on DAB.
 8 April – Mark Goodier begins presenting weekend mid-mornings on Greatest Hits Radio, replacing Pat Sharp. 
 10 April – Steve Wright presents Your Ultimate Queen Song on Radio 2, a countdown of listeners' favourite Queen tracks to celebrate the 50th anniversary of the release of their first album. 
 April – 
CFM is rebranded as Greatest Hits Radio.
Bauer Radio removes local daytime programming from Greatest Hits Radio South Wales.

May
 1 May – Lucy Thomas joins Bauer Media as their new Chief Financial and Operating Officer.
 26–28 May – Radio 1's Big Weekend 2023 takes place at Camperdown Park in Dundee.

June
 8 June – At 10am, Ryan Millns begins a 24 hour broadcast of his breakfast show on Ashdown Radio in aid of St Wilfrid’s Hospice in Eastbourne.
 9 June – Debut of The Tiffany Calver Show on BBC 1Xtra, a two hour show featuring party starter selections.
 10 June – Kisstory hosts one of its summer outdoor day parties at Norwich's Earlham Park.
 17 June – The second of Kisstory's summer outdoor day parties takes place in Bristol.

July
 29 July – The third Kisstory summer outdoor day party of 2023 is held at Blackheath in London.

August

September
 September – The 2023 Make a Difference Awards are held at a series of events in conjunction with BBC Local Radio.

Station debuts

Terrestrial
 13 February – Capital Chill
 16 February – Radio X Classic Rock
 21 February – BASINGSTOKE NOW
 1 March – Nation New

Online
 19 January – Jonny Gould's Jewish State Podcast Radio
 10 February – Absolute Radio Kevin

Small-scale multiplex switch-ons
 19 March – Leicester

Closing this year

Programme debuts
 Dance Britannia, a six part series charting the history of British dance music presented by Sister Bliss on Kisstory.
 January – Uplifting Classics with Dr Alex George, a six week series on Classic FM
 22 January – Zhenya Shkil (Ukrainian language programme) on Radio Bath
 23 January – Buried, a ten-part series investigating the secret dumping of a million tons of waste in Northern Ireland, on BBC Radio 4
 3 February – Friday Night with Nadine on Talkradio
 13 February – The Radio 2 Early Breakfast Show with Owain Wyn Evans on BBC Radio 2
 21 February – The Fast and the Curious (Formula 1 podcast presented by Greg James, Betty Glover and Christian Hewgill)
 26 February – 
Jazz, Blues and Soul with Duncan Barkes on Regency Radio
The Kanneh-Mason Family Takeover, a six-part series presented by the Kanneh-Mason family on Classic FM
 6 March – 10 to the Top on BBC Radio 2
 9 June – The Tiffany Calver Show on BBC 1Xtra

Changes of network affiliation

Continuing radio programmes

1940s
 Desert Island Discs (1942–Present)
 Woman's Hour (1946–Present)
 A Book at Bedtime (1949–Present)

1950s
 The Archers (1950–Present)
 Pick of the Pops (1955–Present)
 The Today Programme (1957–Present)

1960s
 Farming Today (1960–Present)
 In Touch (1961–Present)
 The World at One (1965–Present)
 The Official Chart (1967–Present)
 Just a Minute (1967–Present)
 The Living World (1968–Present)

1970s
 PM (1970–Present)
 Start the Week (1970–Present)
 You and Yours (1970–Present)
 I'm Sorry I Haven't a Clue (1972–Present)
 Good Morning Scotland (1973–Present)
 Newsbeat (1973–Present)
 File on 4 (1977–Present)
 Money Box (1977–Present)
 The News Quiz (1977–Present)
 Feedback (1979–Present)
 The Food Programme (1979–Present)
 Science in Action (1979–Present)

1980s
 In Business (1983–Present)
 Sounds of the 60s (1983–Present)
 Loose Ends (1986–Present)

1990s
 The Moral Maze (1990–Present)
 Essential Selection (1991–Present)
 Essential Mix (1993–Present)
 Up All Night (1994–Present)
 Wake Up to Money (1994–Present)
 Private Passions (1995–Present)
 In Our Time (1998–Present)
 Material World (1998–Present)
 Scott Mills (1998–Present)
 The Now Show (1998–Present)

2000s
 BBC Radio 2 Folk Awards (2000–Present)
 Big John @ Breakfast (2000–Present)
 Sounds of the 70s (2000–2008, 2009–Present)
 Dead Ringers (2000–2007, 2014–Present)
 Kermode and Mayo's Film Review (2001–2022)
 A Kist o Wurds (2002–Present)
 Fighting Talk (2003–Present)
 Jeremy Vine (2003–Present)
 The Chris Moyles Show (2004–2012, 2015–Present)
 Annie Mac (2004–Present)
 Elaine Paige on Sunday (2004–Present)
 The Bottom Line (2006–Present)
 The Unbelievable Truth (2006–Present)
 Radcliffe & Maconie (2007–Present)
 The Media Show (2008–Present)
 Newsjack (2009–Present)

2010s
 The Third Degree (2011–Present)
 BBC Radio 1's Dance Anthems (2012–Present)
 Sounds of the 80s (2013–Present)
 Question Time Extra Time (2013–Present)
 The Show What You Wrote (2013–Present)
 Friday Sports Panel (2014–Present)
 Stumped (2015–Present)
 You, Me and the Big C (2018–present)
 Radio 1's Party Anthems (2019–present)

2020s
 Frank Skinner's Poetry Podcast (2020–Present)
 Newscast (2020–Present)
 Sounds of the 90s (2020–present)
 The News Agents (2022–Present)
 10 to the Top'' (2023–Present)

Ending this year

Deaths
 4 January – Aled Glynne Davies, 65, broadcaster and former editor of BBC Radio Cymru) (went missing on 31 December 2022, body found on date)
 24 January – Phil Dawson, 77, founder and director of Fantasy Radio, as well as breakfast show presenter (death reported on date)
 13 February – Denis McNeill, Q Radio Belfast presenter. 
 February – Paul Easton, 69, radio programme producer (reported on 20 February)
 19 February – Dickie Davies, 94, inaugural sports commentator of Classic FM
 23 February – John Motson, 77, football commentator (BBC Sport)

See also
 2023 in the United Kingdom
 2023 in British music
 2023 in British television
 List of British films of 2023

References

Radio
British Radio, 2021 In
Years in British radio